Novosphingobium marinum  is a Gram-negative, aerobic and short rod-shaped bacterium from the genus Novosphingobium which has been isolated from sea water from the Pacific Ocean.

References

External links
Type strain of Novosphingobium marinum at BacDive -  the Bacterial Diversity Metadatabase	

Bacteria described in 2015
Sphingomonadales